Me Two (La Personne Aux Deux Personnes) is a 2008 French comedy film directed by Nicolas & Bruno

Plot
It's the story of Gilles Gabriel, a bit of a pop star in the 1980s, who dies in a car accident caused by Jean-Christian Ranu, an uptight employee of a large corporation, whose headquarters are at La Defense just outside Paris. But Gilles is not totally dead: his spirit has landed in Jean-Christian's head and Jean-Christian has a hard time figuring out who is suddenly talking to him. As for Gilles, he's as boisterous as ever, but has no control over his host's behaviour. Gilles and Jean-Christian go through various stages before accepting the obvious: they are going to have to cope with the situation, two people in one person's body, despite their entirely different personalities. Condemned to intimacy, they learn how to get on, stretch each other's boundaries, and surprise each other.

Cast
 Daniel Auteuil as Jean-Christian Ranu
 Alain Chabat as Gilles Gabriel
 Marina Fois as Muriel Perrache
 François Damiens as COGIP Doctor
JoeyStarr as himself
Herbert Léonard as himself

References

External links
 Me Two on Unifrance website Me two (2007)
 Me Two on IMDB La personne aux deux personnes
 Review in Variety Me Two

2008 films
2008 comedy films
French comedy films
2000s French-language films
Films directed by Nicolas Charlet
Films directed by Bruno Lavaine
2000s French films